Saint Helier is a parish in the island of Jersey named after Saint Helier. Other places named after the saint are:

St. Helier, London - a suburb in the London Boroughs of Merton and Sutton
St Helier railway station - a railway station in the suburb of the same name in London
St Heliers Correctional Centre - a prison in New South Wales, Australia
Saint-Hélier, Côte-d'Or - a commune of eastern France
Saint Heliers, New Zealand - a suburb of Auckland
Saint Heliers, Melbourne - a part of the suburb of Abbotsford

See also
Saint-Hellier - a commune in Haute-Normandie